Ewha Womans University Press (이화여자대학교출판부 ) is a book publisher founded in 1949.

History
The Ewha Womans University Press (EUP), the nation's first university press, was founded in 1949. The EUP's mission has been the advancement of academic communities and enlightenment of Korean society by publishing scholarly writings of Korean professors and books for university students, and translating and publishing prominent writings by foreign scholars.

The EUP has firmly established itself as Korea's most prestigious university press in terms of both scope and quality of publications. So far EUP has published more than 1,200 titles, of which 600 are currently available at bookstore across Korea.

In order to contribute to maintaining and enhancing the quality of academic publishing, EUP is a member of the following Korean and international publishers organizations:
 Association of Korean University Presses.
 Korean Publishers Association. 
 International Association of Scholarly Publishers.

Although associated with the university, EUP operates independently in a regulatory context established by the Ministry of Culture and Tourism.

References

External links
 Ewha Press, official website ; 

Publishing companies established in 1949
University presses of South Korea
Book publishing companies of South Korea
Seodaemun District
Mass media in Seoul